Ethyl cyanoacrylate (ECA), a cyanoacrylate ester, is an ethyl ester of 2-cyano-acrylic acid. It is a colorless liquid with low viscosity and a faint sweet smell in pure form. It is the main component of cyanoacrylate glues and can be encountered under many trade names. It is soluble in acetone, methyl ethyl ketone, nitromethane, and methylene chloride. ECA polymerizes rapidly in presence of moisture.

Production
Ethyl cyanoacrylate is prepared by the condensation of formaldehyde with ethyl cyanoacetate:

This exothermic reaction affords the polymer, which is subsequently sintered, thermally "cracked" to give the monomer.  Alternatively, it can be prepared by the ethoxycarbonylation of cyanoacetylene.

Applications
Ethyl cyanoacrylate is used for gluing. 

In forensics, cyanoacrylate ester has excellent non-destructive impressioning abilities, which are especially important when lifting fingerprints from delicate evidence items, or when the prints could not be lifted using traditional means such as fingerprinting powder. The procedure involves heating the acrylate in a sealed chamber. Its fumes then seek out deposited proteins that form into a white, stable, and clear print outlines. The resulting prints could be used as is or enhanced further by staining them with darker pigments.

Its polymers are not used for liquid bandages.  That role is fulfilled by the less toxic n-butyl and octyl cyanoacrylates.

Safety
In the U.S., the threshold limit value for ECA is 0.2 ppm.  It is a strong irritant to the lungs and eyes.

See also
 Cyanoacrylate
 Methyl cyanoacrylate
 Butyl cyanoacrylate
 Octyl cyanoacrylate

References

Ethyl esters
Monomers
Cyanoacrylate esters
Lachrymatory agents
Sweet-smelling chemicals